"Resignation" is a poem by Friedrich Schiller, published in 1786 in the journal Thalia.

Poetry by Friedrich Schiller
1786 poems